Michael de Monymusk († 1376) was a 14th-century bishop of Dunkeld. He held a licentiate in Canon law. He had been dean of the bishopric of Dunblane, dean of the bishopric of Aberdeen, and then dean of the bishopric of Glasgow. While dean of Dunblane, he held prebends in the bishopric of Brechin and the bishopric of Ross, and while holding the deanery of Glasgow, petitioned Pope Urban V for a vacant prebend and canonry in Aberdeen. Pope Urban V appointed him to the bishopric of Dunkeld on 13 November 1370. He may have held the position of Chamberlain of Scotland. He died on 1 March 1376, and was buried in the choir of Dunkeld Cathedral.

References

Sources
Dowden, John, The Bishops of Scotland, ed. J. Maitland Thomson, (Glasgow, 1912)

14th-century births
1376 deaths
Bishops of Dunkeld (pre-Reformation)
Lord Chamberlains of Scotland
People from Aberdeenshire
Burials at Dunkeld Cathedral
14th-century Scottish Roman Catholic bishops